MFK Topvar Topoľčany is a Slovak football team, based in the town of Topoľčany. The club was founded in 1912.

Current squad

Notable players 
Had international caps for their respective countries. Players whose name is listed in bold represented their countries while playing for MFK.

Past (and present) players who are the subjects of Wikipedia articles can be found here.

 Mário Breška
 Peter Doležaj
 Jean-Claude Iranzi
 Ladislav Jurkemik
 Agbor Kelvin
 Jozef Marko
 Vahagn Militosyan
 Fitina Omborenga
 Anton Švajlen

References

External links 
Official club website 
 

 
Football clubs in Slovakia
Association football clubs established in 1912
MFK Topvar Topolcany